Sellars Farm site (40WI1), also known as the Sellars Farm state archaeological area and Sellars Indian mound,  is a Mississippian culture archaeological site located in Wilson County, Tennessee, near Lebanon. The platform mound was the site of a settlement from about 1000 to 1300 CE. Today, the site is a satellite unit of Long Hunter State Park. The non-profit Friends of the Sellars Farm State Archaeological Area organization conducts tours and upkeep of the site. It was listed on the National Register of Historic Places on December 11, 1972.

Numerous sandstone figurines have been unearthed on the site. One of these statues, known as "Sandy," was featured on a United States postage stamp. and is the official State Artifact of Tennessee

See also
 Duck River cache
 Chucalissa
 Link Farm Mound
 Mound Bottom
 Obion Mounds

References

External links

 Sellars Indian Mound, Lebanon, TN Mississippian • Mound Complex & Earthworks 
 Long Hunter State Park
 Sellars Farm State Archaeological Area-walking tour brochure

Middle Mississippian culture
Mounds in Tennessee
Native American history of Tennessee
Archaeological sites on the National Register of Historic Places in Tennessee
Protected areas of Wilson County, Tennessee
National Register of Historic Places in Wilson County, Tennessee